Vilma Bánky (born Vilma Koncsics; 9 January 1901 – 18 March 1991) was a Hungarian-American silent film actress. Although her acting career began in Budapest, and she later worked in France, Austria, and Germany, Bánky was best known for her roles in the American films The Eagle and The Son of the Sheik with Rudolph Valentino, and for several romantic teamings with Ronald Colman.

Early life
Bánky was born on 9 January 1901 to János Bánky Koncsics and Katalin Ulbert, in Nagydorog, Austria-Hungary. Her father was a bureau chief in Franz Joseph's Austro-Hungarian Empire. Shortly after her birth, her father, a police sergeant, was transferred to Budapest, and the family relocated. She had two siblings – an older brother, Gyula and a younger sister, Gizella. After graduation from secondary school, Bánky (as she would later be known) took courses to work as a stenographer, but was offered a role in a film.

Career

She was hailed as "The Hungarian Rhapsody" and was an immediate hit with American audiences. The New York Times remarked in its review of her first American film, The Dark Angel (1925), that she "is a young person of rare beauty ... so exquisite that one is not in the least surprised that she is never forgotten by Hillary Trent" (the movie's leading male character who decides to allow his family and fiancee to believe him dead rather than place what he perceives as the burden on them of a life caring for a blinded war veteran).

She appeared opposite silent film star Rudolph Valentino in The Eagle (1925) and The Son of the Sheik (1926). Valentino reportedly was fascinated by Vilma, and chose her as the leading lady in the films. She also appeared opposite Ronald Colman in a series of love stories, including The Dark Angel and The Winning of Barbara Worth. It is commonly believed that her thick Hungarian accent led, with the advent of sound, to her career being cut short; however, she began losing interest in films and wanted to settle down with Rod La Rocque and simply be his wife. By 1928, she had begun announcing her intention to retire in a few years. 

Of her 24 films, eight exist in their entirety (Hotel Potemkin, Der Zirkuskönig (The King of the Circus) with Max Linder, The Son of the Sheik, The Eagle, The Winning of Barbara Worth, The Night of Love, A Lady to Love, and The Rebel), and three exist in fragments (Tavaszi szerelem in scattered bits, the first five reels of The Magic Flame, and an incomplete copy of Two Lovers).

Personal life and death

She married actor Rod La Rocque in 1927; they remained married until his death in 1969. The couple had no children.

Bánky died on 18 March 1991, from cardiopulmonary failure, aged 90, but notice of her death was not made public until the following year. She was reportedly upset that no one had come to visit her in her last years, and directed her lawyer to make no mention of her death. Her ashes were scattered at sea where her husband's had been consigned. 

For her contributions to the film industry, Bánky received a motion pictures star on the Hollywood Walk of Fame in 1960. Her star is located at 7021 Hollywood Boulevard.

In popular culture
 Bánky is mentioned by Mr. Burns in The Simpsons episode "Homer Defined".

Filmography

Bibliography
Schildgen, Rachel A. More Than a Dream: Rediscovering the Life & Films of Vilma Banky; .

References

External links

Vilma Bánky: Hungarian Rhapsody, vilma-banky.com 
Information on Vilma Bánky, szineszkonyvtar.hu 
Photographs of Vilma Bánky, film.virtual-history.com

1901 births
1991 deaths
20th-century American actresses
American silent film actresses
American film actresses
Hungarian emigrants to the United States
Hungarian silent film actresses
20th-century Hungarian actresses
People from Tolna County